Koepsell is a surname. Notable people with the surname include: 

David Koepsell (born 1969), American author, philosopher, attorney, and educator
John J. Koepsell (1852–1925), American businessman and politician